The following article presents a summary of the 2011 football (soccer) season in Armenia, which was the 20th season of competitive football in the country.

National teams

Armenia

Armenia U21

Armenia U19

Armenia U17

League tables

Premier League

First League

Armenian clubs in Europe

Summary

Pyunik

Mika

Banants

Ulisses

References